Sarah Inghelbrecht (born 1 October 1992) is a Belgian road and track cyclist, who most recently rode for UCI Women's Continental Team . She competed at the 2013 UCI Track Cycling World Championships.

Major results

2012
 2nd  Team pursuit, UEC European Under-23 Track Championships (with Jolien D'Hoore and Gilke Croket)
2014
 Irish International Track GP
2nd Scratch
3rd Keirin
3rd Omnium
 3rd Points race, Belgian Xmas Meetings
2015
 2nd Time trial, West Flanders Provincial Road Championships
2016
 7th Gran Prix San Luis Femenino
2017
 6th Tour of Guangxi
2018
 7th Overall Tour of Eftalia Hotels & Velo Alanya
 10th Veenendaal–Veenendaal Classic
2019
 10th Overall Tour of Thailand

References

External links

1992 births
Living people
Belgian track cyclists
Belgian female cyclists
Sportspeople from Bruges
Cyclists from West Flanders
21st-century Belgian women